The Politics of Xi'an in Shaanxi province in the People's Republic of China is structured in a dual party-government system like all other governing institutions in mainland China.

The Mayor of Xi'an is the highest-ranking official in the People's Government of Xi'an or Xi'an Municipal Government. However, in the city's dual party-government governing system, the Mayor has less power than the Communist Party of Xi'an Municipal Committee Secretary, colloquially termed the "CPC Party Chief of Xi'an" or "Communist Party Secretary of Xi'an".

History
In November 2015, Sun Qingyun was put under investigation for alleged "serious violations of discipline", he was placed on two-year probation within the Party, having held the consultative position for only nine months; he was demoted to section rank "non-leading position".

On May 22, 2017, Wei Minzhou was suspected of "serious violations of discipline", and placed under investigation by the Central Commission for Discipline Inspection (CCDI).

On October 29, 2018, Shangguan Jiqing was placed on probation within the Communist Party. The Communist government suspended him, and then downgraded him. He has been demoted to less responsible job. The government confiscated his illegal gains.

List of mayors of Xi'an

List of CPC Party secretaries of Xi'an

References

Xi'an
Xi'an